MIHR is a contemporary dance company in Armenia. MIHR Theatre was established in 2003 by sister and brother, Shoghakat and  Tsolak  Mlke-Galstyans in Yerevan, Armenia. MIHR Theatre is the first contemporary dance theatre in Armenia.

History 
MIHR theatre was named after Mihr, the Armenian pagan god of Sun as symbol of enlightenment. The theatre is mainly addressing social injustice such as problems of war and peace, domestic violence etc.

Throughout its existence MIHR theatre has worked in many different genres of motion such as contemporary dance, site-specific performance, emotional dance, inclusive dance, action-painting, open-air performances, physical performance and drama dance.

MIHR Theatre has created its own way of dance choreography titled "Music of Movement". This is a unique technique combining music and dance, and at the same time it is based on a dancer who is creating music via movements. The instruments for "Music of Movement" were  designed and created by MIHR Theatre for this special project.

MIHR Theatre has produced 21 contemporary dance  performances, 8 films. The theatre has organized different festivals: Asank Anank (2015), The Book Fest (2017), Polish Platform at the HIGH Fest International Performing Arts Festival (2016, 2018);  open-air events, parades: Opening Parades of the HIGH Fest International Performing Arts Festival (2005, 2006, 2007, 2008, 2009, 2010)  and other events in different cities.

MIHR Theatre has participated in numerous international festivals.

Cultural collaborations and joint performances 
MIHR Theatre pays great attention to international cultural collaborations and  has  joint performances and collaborations  with theatres and performers from different countries: 
2015 — joint performance "Lavash" with Gabrielle Neuhaus Physical Theatre (Israel)                                                                                                                                                               
2015 — performance "Names": collaboration with Alexander Aram Adamyan-Harvey  (United States)                 
2014 — joint performance "Water by the Spoonful" with US Embassy in Armenia, advisors: Armando Riesco (United States) and KJ Sanchez (United States)  
2014 — joint performance "P2" with Sayeh Theatre (Iran)
2007 — joint performance "Abay 4" by M. Telibekov with Art & Shock Theatre (Kazakhstan)
2006 — project "Inside" with Laboratory of Stage Arts (Latvia)

Creative co-productions with movie-makers 
2018 — "Taniel"  - film noir
2015 — "Remembering Armenia" - documentary movie 
2013 — "The Percussion Instruments"  - documentary/educational feature film 
2013 — "Zaum Tractor" - video art
2008 — "Kamancha"  - documentary/educational feature film 
2007 — "Roots" - dance movie with ethno-modern sculptures 
2007 — "Angel on the Roofs" - dance movie 
2006 — "Dreams or Reality" - social movie

Gallery

References

Further reading 
Васенина, Екатерина (2013). Современный танец постсоветского пространства. «БАЛЕТ».

External links
 Official site

Dance companies in Armenia
Contemporary dance companies